George Monk may refer to:
George Monck, 1st Duke of Albemarle (1608–1670), English soldier and sailor
George William Monk (1838–1917), Canadian politician

See also
George Monks (disambiguation)